The Fisher–Zugelder House and Smith Cottage, at 601 N. Wisconsin St. in Gunnison, Colorado, are two houses listed together on the National Register of Historic Places in 1984.

The two houses, built during 1880–81, were the first stone houses in Gunnison, at the cusp of the town's development out of the camp phase, in the typical Colorado mining town development phases (exploration, settlement, camp, and town).  The camp phase was short, from c.1879 into 1881, as tents and temporary structures were replaced by frame structures, supported by sawmill operations.  The town organized formally in January 1880.

In 1880 David Fisher opened quarrying of sandstone, using deposits along the Gunnison River.  He chose to use this material for his own home, and contracted with stonemason Frederick Zugelder to build these.

The Fisher–Zugelder House is a two-story, gabled sandstone house with an irregular "L" plan. The Smith Cottage is a one-story gabled sandstone building,  in plan. The style is termed "transitional vernacular".

References

National Register of Historic Places in Gunnison County, Colorado
Houses completed in 1881
1881 establishments in Colorado